Throughout history, architects have often been chosen by setting up an architectural competition and awarding the commission on the basis of the most favoured design. With the advent of the internet, a similar process has been set up by a number of businesses offering small-scale competitions for mainly domestic projects. Like an architectural competition, contributors must register but their designs are judged anonymously, and only the winning design is paid a fee.

Business models
A growing number of architectural crowdsourcing platforms direct their calls openly to members of the public, facilitating mass-participation and self-organized collaboration to build upon and improve architectural design solutions. This follows from Jeff Howe's original definition of the term crowdsourcing, which emphasises the idea of an open call to an undefined group of people, because "the person who you think would be best qualified to perform the job, isn't always the best person to do it."

Criticism
Crowdsourcing architecture has been heavily criticized by professional architects and architectural guilds. Dwell, America's leading home and architecture magazine, called the launch of arcbazar "the worst thing to happen to architecture since the internet started." This statement caused many heated debates among architectural bloggers worldwide. The magazine Architects' Journal wrote: "Architecture crowd-sourcing website criticized: Architects have slammed a threatening new crowd-sourcing website in the US which promises to reduce clients' costs."

References

External links
Crowdsourcing Design: The End of Architecture, or a New Beginning? By Michael Crosbie at ArchNewsNow.com, April 8, 2014.
 Structures for Creativity: The crowdsourcing of design by Jeffrey V. Nickerson, Yasuaki Sakamoto, and Lixiu Yu.
 The New World of Building Design By Aarni Heiskanen at AEC business, February 18, 2013.
 Designers, clients forge ties on web By Marie Szaniszlo at the Boston Herald, June 11, 2012.
 Architecture for the crowd by the crowd Interview by Eric Blatterberg at crowdsourcing.org, October 21, 2011.
 Architecture crowd-sourcing website criticised Article by Merlin Fulcher in the Architects' Journal, September 29, 2011.
 Moving Architecture Online Public interview at Venture Café, Cambridge, MA, June 21, 2011.
 Crowdsourced Architecture? by ID/Lab -wayfinding, wayshowing, placemaking, legibility, and human behaviour in navigation, January 18, 2011
 Shepherding the Crowd: An Approach to More Creative Crowd Work by Steven Dow and Scott Klemmer
Structures for Creativity: The crowdsourcing of design by Jeffrey V. Nickerson, Yasuaki Sakamoto, and Lixiu Yu

Architectural competitions
Crowdsourcing
Interior design
Home improvement